Napoléon-Pierre Tanguay (November 8, 1862 – February 25, 1927) was a Canadian provincial politician. He was the Liberal member of the Legislative Assembly of Quebec for Wolfe from 1904 to 1919.

References

1862 births
1927 deaths
People from Estrie
Quebec Liberal Party MNAs